Gulistan  (Pashto and ) is a town and tehsil headquarters of the Qilla Abdullah District in the Balochistan province of Pakistan. Gulistan envelopes many tribes like the Achakzais, Kakars, Tareens and Syeds. It is located at 30°36'26"N, 66°35'2"E at an elevation of 1,481 metres (4,862 feet). Gulistan has a reputation for its fresh fruit.

References

Qila Abdullah District